Durán Canton is a canton of Ecuador, located in the Guayas Province.  Its capital is the town of Durán.  Its population at the 2001 census was 178,714.

Demographics
Ethnic groups as of the Ecuadorian census of 2010:
Mestizo  70.3%
Afro-Ecuadorian  10.9%
White  9.7%
Montubio  5.7%
Indigenous  2.9%
Other  0.5%

References

Cantons of Guayas Province